Holding is a surname. Notable people with the surname include:

Billy Holding, rugby league footballer of the 1920s, '30s, and '40s for Cumberland, Warrington, Rochdale Hornets
Clyde Holding (1931–2011), Australian politician
Eddie Holding (1930–2014), English footballer and manager
Michael Holding, cricketer
Robert Holding, the majority owner of Sinclair Oil
Rob Holding, (1995– ), English footballer